The 1961 Buffalo Bulls football team was an American football team that represented the University of Buffalo as an independent during the 1961 NCAA College Division football season. In its seventh season under head coach Dick Offenhamer, the team compiled a 4–5 record. The team played its home games at Rotary Field in Buffalo, New York.

Schedule

References

Buffalo
Buffalo Bulls football seasons
Buffalo Bulls football